The 1890–91 season was Stoke's only season in the Football Alliance.

Stoke played their only season in the Football Alliance which they won the title and were re-elected back into the Football League at the end of the season. Stoke found life much easier in the Alliance and lost just twice as they ended up with 33 points and their first league title.

Season review

League
For the 1890–91 season Stoke joined the Football Alliance which comprised 12 teams made up from the Midlands and the North. This was very much the secondary competition to the Football League and while Stoke had struggled in their two previous seasons, they quickly came to grips with life in the Alliance and finished as champions. Stoke only lost two matches all season and were re-elected back into the Football League. Both defeats came in Birmingham, 5–2 at St George's and 5–1 at Small Heath and in both games they had their goalkeeper (Bill Rowley and Wilf Merritt respectively) carried off due to injury. With no reserve 'keepers available for the following fixtures Stoke resorted to utilising two outfield players, Hughie Phillips v Crewe Alexandra and Alf Underwood v Bootle in goal. Eventually Ike Brookes the Staffordshire County cricket wicket-keeper was signed for the rest of the season and played in the last 12 matches where Stoke remained unbeaten to claim the title.

FA Cup
While out of the Football League, Stoke played a major part in the formation of the penalty kick when, in February 1891 they were knocked out of the FA Cup in the third round by Notts County 1–0 after two previous 3–0 victory's over Preston North End and Aston Villa. With time running out and Stoke pressing forward for an equalizer, Notts County's defender Jack Hendry handled in the area so the referee gave a free kick to Stoke. Notts County put all eleven men on the line and Stoke failed to score. This same referee, who recognised what an unjust event had occurred later became a football legislator and it was he who introduced the penalty kick to the Football League and FA Cup competitions for the 1891–92 season.

Final league table

Results

Stoke's score comes first

Legend

Football Alliance

FA Cup

Squad statistics

References

Stoke City F.C. seasons
Stoke